Dionysius was Bishop of Vienne. He was among the ten missionaries sent by Pope St. Sixtus I with St. Peregrinus to Gaul. Dionysius later succeeded St. Justus as Bishop of Vienne, in Dauphiné, France.

References

193 deaths
2nd-century bishops in Gaul
2nd-century Christian saints
Gallo-Roman saints
Year of birth unknown